Elaine Irwin (born August 26, 1969) is an American model. She was the face of Almay Cosmetics and Ralph Lauren.

Early life and career 
Elaine Irwin was born in Gilbertsville, Pennsylvania. She left home when she was 16 to pursue a modeling career and was discovered by photographer Paul Pelak and his wife Margaret while enrolled at John Casablancas in 1985. After her photo appeared in Seventeen in 1985, the Boyertown honor student and varsity letter-winner in track and cross country was a much sought-after face for magazine covers, advertisements and commercials.

In 1989 she appeared in the music video for New Order's "Round and Round" off their 1989 album Technique. Within a few years, she became one of the Ford Models and had appeared on the cover of dozens of fashion magazines, including Cosmopolitan, Glamour, Self and Elite. Her American Beauty Vogue cover was shot by Richard Avedon.

She made her move onto the runway for Victoria's Secret and Calvin Klein and soon became a favorite subject of photographers Herb Ritts, Irving Penn, and Steven Meisel for her natural, soft look.

Irwin became the first woman to drive the pace car at the Indianapolis 500 in May 2001. She was also an at-large delegate to the 2004 Democratic National Convention.

Personal life 
Elaine was 23 years old when she married musician John Mellencamp on September 5, 1992. The two met when she was hired to appear on the cover of Mellencamp's Whenever We Wanted album (and appear in the music video for "Get A Leg Up"). Within 10 weeks, they were engaged. They have two sons.

On December 30, 2010, it was announced that she and Mellencamp were separating after eighteen years of marriage, but both chose to stay in Indiana to raise their two children. On January 14, 2011, John Mellencamp filed for divorce and requested that Elaine be returned to her maiden name 'Irwin'. On August 12, 2011, their divorce was finalized.

In October 2012, Irwin became engaged to racecar team owner and media businessman Jay Penske. They had a daughter in May 2013. She has resided in California since 2013.

References

External links 
 
 
 
 

1969 births
Living people
21st-century American women
Female models from Pennsylvania
IMG Models models
People from Douglass Township, Montgomery County, Pennsylvania